The China Council for the Promotion of International Trade (CCPIT) is a trade body founded in 1952. It also goes by the name of the China Chamber of International Commerce (CCOIC). CCPIT is affiliated with the Ministry of Commerce.

The CCPIT develops business cooperation and exchanges with foreign countries and has long been associated with the Chinese Communist Party's united front strategy. It is charged with organizing trade fairs and events in promotion of the Belt and Road Initiative. In response to the COVID-19 pandemic, CCPIT was charged with issuing force majeure certificates to Chinese companies unable to meet their contractual trade obligations.

See also
List of countries by leading trade partners
China International Contractors Association
China Investment Promotion Agency
CCPIT Patent & Trademark Law Office

References

External links
 

Chambers of commerce
Foreign trade of China
Auto show organizers
Organizations established in 1952
1952 establishments in China
Investment promotion agencies
Chinese investment abroad
Organizations associated with the Chinese Communist Party
United front (China)